The Football Foundation is the United Kingdom's largest sports charity, channelling funding from the Premier League, The FA and the government (through Sport England) into transforming the landscape of grassroots sport in England.

History

Launched in 2000, the Football Foundation awards grants to grassroots clubs and organisations to help build and refurbish new and existing community sports facilities, such as changing pavilions, natural grass pitches or all-weather playing surfaces, for schools, and local authority facilities or sports clubs.

Founded in 2000, the Football Foundation is now the largest sports charity in UK. So far, the foundation has used the investment from partners to award more than 17,600 grants to improve facilities worth more than £708m – including 885 artificial grass pitches, 3,587 natural grass pitches and 1,210 changing facilities.  This has attracted an additional £885m of partnership funding – totalling over £1.5bn investment in grassroots football.

Through the foundation, the Premier League, The FA and government through Sport England have come together to create the National Football Facilities Strategy (NFFS) that will guide work over the next ten years to transform many more local facilities. Local football facility plans (LFFP) are being created to identify priority projects where demand is greatest, and the impact will be strongest and help stimulate the action required to deliver them.

Ambassadors 

 Georgie Bingham
 Dion Dublin
 Graeme Le Saux
 Gary Neville
 John Scales
 Ben Shephard
 Gareth Southgate
 Graham Taylor OBE
 Dan Walker
 Faye White
 Lawrie McMenemy
 Nigel Adkins
 James Beattie
 Chris Powell
 Hayley McQueen
 Duncan Watmore

References

External links
 

Charities based in the United Kingdom
Football organisations in England
Organisations based in the London Borough of Camden
Sports charities
Sport in the London Borough of Camden
Organizations established in 2000